Elections to Lambeth London Borough Council were held in May 1994. Turnout was 42.7%.

Election result

|}

Ward results

References

1994
1994 London Borough council elections
20th century in the London Borough of Lambeth